Ten Ready Rifles is a 1959 Spanish drama film directed by José Luis Sáenz de Heredia. The film concerns the Carlist Wars of the 19th century. It was entered into the 9th Berlin International Film Festival.

Cast
 Francisco Rabal as José Iribarren
 Ettore Manni as Miguel
 Rosa Arenas as Teresa (as Rosita Arenas)
 Berta Riaza as Maritxu
 Memmo Carotenuto as Don Leopoldo Bejarano
 Milly Vitale as Lucía
 Félix de Pomés as Coronel García Zapata
 Santiago Rivero
 Xan das Bolas as Cañete
 María Jesús Lara
 Juan Calvo as Capellán
 Jesús Puente as Alguacil en Consejo de Guerra
 José María Lado (as Jose Mª Lado)
 Juan Cazalilla
 Carola Fernán Gómez (as Carola Fernan-Gomez)
 Pilar Clemens
 Carlos Martínez Campos (as Carlos Mnez. Campos)
 Beni Deus (as Beny Deus)

References

External links

1959 films
1950s historical drama films
Spanish historical drama films
1950s Spanish-language films
Spanish black-and-white films
Films set in the 19th century
Films directed by José Luis Sáenz de Heredia
1950s Spanish films